Report to the Principal's Office is a 1991 children's novel by the American author, Jerry Spinelli. It depicts the first few days of school at the brand-new, state-of-the-art Plumstead Middle School. The book follows five main characters: Sunny Wyler, a girl who wants to go to her friend's middle school but cannot. Eddie Mott, who wants to fit in and make new friends. Salem Brownmiller, who sees herself as a future famous writer. Pickles Johnson, who enjoys inventing all sorts of things. T. Charles Brimlow, who sees all of these sixth graders as "the Principal's Posse", as he later names them. All of these sixth graders will report to the principal's (T. Charles Brimlow's) office, hence the title, Report to the Principal's Office.

Hillary Kain and Sunny Wyler are best friends. They live across the street from each other. But when Hillary and Sunny find out they are going to separate middle schools, they are thrown into depression. Sunny vows to not change her shirt, not wash her hair, and never even smile until she gets into the same school as Hillary.

School begins at brand-new Plumstead Middle School, and there are four sixth graders who, somehow, meet. Eddie Mott is a child who tries to fit in, yet still has a hard time. One time he got beaten up on the morning bus. Salem Brownmiller, a girl who loves to write stories, enjoys this because she is writing a story about a sixth-grade boy's first day at middle school – and Eddie is the perfect fit.
And on the first day, they are all sent to report to the principal, Eric F. T. Charles Brimlow.

External links

Author Jerry Spinelli's homepage

1991 American novels
1991 children's books
American children's novels
Novels set in high schools and secondary schools
Novels by Jerry Spinelli
Scholastic Corporation books